Antiplecta triangularis is a species of scoopwing moth in the family Uraniidae. It is found in the Caribbean Sea, Central America, and North America.

The MONA or Hodges number for Antiplecta triangularis is 7652.

References

Further reading

 

Uraniidae
Articles created by Qbugbot
Moths described in 1906